The 1975 FA Charity Shield was the 53rd FA Charity Shield, an annual football match played between the winners of the previous season's First Division and FA Cup competitions. The match was played on 9 August 1975 at Wembley Stadium and contested by Derby County, who had won the 1974–75 First Division, and West Ham United, who had won the 1974–75 FA Cup. Derby County won the match by 2–0.

Match details

Summary
Kevin Hector opened the scoring for Derby in the 20th minute when he scored with a low right footed shot from the right of the penalty area. Roy McFarland got the second goal for Derby from two yards out after a corner from the left was headed back into the six yard box by Francis Lee.

Details

See also
1974–75 Football League
1974–75 FA Cup

1975
Charity Shield 1975
Charity Shield 1975
Comm
Fa Charity Shield
Fa Charity Shield